Pathar-ka-Gosht  - (Urdu - پتھر کا گوشت ) is a popular lamb dish, especially prepared in Hyderabad, Telangana, India. This dish is prepared with mutton by heating it on a wide stone, on a flame. The spices are added once the meat pieces are heated and served with onions and other ingredients.

References

External links
Recipe
A video on YouTube describing the cooking process of Pathar-ka-Gosht
Patthar Ka Gosht

Hyderabadi cuisine
Telangana cuisine
Lamb dishes